Thröstur Thórhallsson (Icelandic orthography: Þrostur Þorhallsson; born 19 March 1969) is an Icelandic chess grandmaster. He was Icelandic Chess Champion in 2012.

Chess career
Born in 1969, Thröstur obtained the international master title in 1987, followed by the grandmaster title in 1996. His peak rating is 2510, set in July 1997. He won the Icelandic Chess Championship in 2012. He is the No. 9 ranked Icelandic player as of September 2020.

References

External links

1969 births
Living people
Icelandic chess players
Chess grandmasters